Raudwara Publishing House (also known as Raudwara) is a textbook publisher in Estonia founded in 2007.

Raudwara's books include:
 Walemid (2015)
 Matemaatika Raudwara (2012)
 Bioloogia ja Geograafia Raudwara (2012)

References

Publishing companies of Estonia
Estonian literature
Book publishing companies of Estonia